Embecovirus is a subgenus of coronaviruses in the genus Betacoronavirus. The viruses in this subgenus, unlike other coronaviruses, have a hemagglutinin esterase (HE) gene. The viruses in the subgenus were previously known as group 2a coronaviruses.

Structure 

The viruses of this subgenus, like other coronaviruses, have a lipid bilayer envelope in which the membrane (M), envelope (E) and spike (S) structural proteins are anchored. Unlike other coronaviruses, viruses in this subgenus also have an additional shorter spike-like structural protein called hemagglutinin esterase (HE).

Recombination

Genetic recombination can occur when two or more viral genomes are present in the same host cell.  The dromedary camel beta-coronavirus (Beta-CoV HKU23) exhibits genetic diversity in the African camel population.  Contributing to this diversity are several recombination events that had taken place in the past between closely related Beta-CoVs of the subgenus Embecovirus.

See also 

Sarbecovirus (group 2b)
Merbecovirus (group 2c)
Nobecovirus (group 2d)

References

Virus subgenera
Betacoronaviruses